Heusinger von Waldegg is a surname of German descent. It is often used abbreviated as "Heusinger" in many forms (especially in the United States).

Notable people with the surname include:
Adolf Heusinger, first general of NATO
Edmund Heusinger von Waldegg, railway pioneer
Karl Friedrich Heusinger, pathologist
Patrick Heusinger, actor